Aihtaras Easabat Al'nisa is a 1986 Egyptian movie directed and written by Mohamed Abaza and co-written by Essam Al Gamblaty.

Plot
The leader of a criminal gang known for smuggling diamond has a journalist on her tail who wants to reveal her identity. In the quest to capture her another criminal called Shaukat host a chess game to capture her because she is good in the game of chess.

Cast
 Samir Ghanem
 Elham Shahin
 Sayed Zayan
 Sawsan Badr
 Hadi Al Jayyar
 Vivian Salah Eldin
 Azza Gamal El-Din
 Adel Abd Elmenaem
 Menirva
 Mahmoud El Zohairy
 Aml Ibrahim
 Nasr Hammad

References
  

Egyptian comedy films
1980s Arabic-language films
1986 films